Chionodes ensis is a moth in the family Gelechiidae. It is found in North America, where it has been recorded from Utah, Colorado, Alberta and the Northwest Territories.

References

Chionodes
Moths described in 1999
Moths of North America